Osazuwa is a Bini surname. Notable people with the surname include:

Agnes Osazuwa (born 1989), Nigerian sprinter
Uhunoma Osazuwa (born 1987), Nigerian heptathlete

Surnames of Nigerian origin